State Route 85 (SR 85) is a  state highway in the west-central part of the U.S. state of Georgia. It travels within portions of Muscogee, Harris, Talbot, Meriwether, Coweta, Fayette, and Clayton counties. It connects the Columbus and Forest Park areas, via Manchester, Woodbury, Senoia, Fayetteville, and Riverdale.

Route description

Muscogee and Harris counties 

GA SR 85 begins at an intersection with US 27/SR 1 in downtown Columbus. It continues to the northwest until it meets the southern terminus of SR 22 Connector. SR 85 then heads east and meets SR 219 before it has a second intersection with US 27/SR 1. At that intersection, US 27 Alt. begins, running concurrent with SR 85, up to the Harris–Talbot county line, where US 27 Alt. north/SR 85 Alt. north/SR 116 west take the left fork at an intersection while SR 85 north and SR 116 east take the right one.

Talbot County 
Less than  into Talbot County, SR 116 splits off to the east, while SR 85 continues to the northeast. Just before entering Manchester, SR 85 intersects SR 41, which begins a short concurrency into Meriwether County and Manchester.

Meriwether County 
SR 41 and SR 85 intersect the eastern terminus of SR 190 just inside of the Manchester city limits. At 2nd Street, SR 41 departs to the northwest, while SR 85 heads into downtown. Then, SR 85 turns to the east, while SR 85 Spur continues straight ahead. In Woodbury, SR 85 meets SR 18/SR 74/SR 109. At this intersection, SR 74 turns to the north, concurrent with SR 85. They reach the northern terminus of SR 85 Alternate. Farther to the north, in Gay, is the eastern terminus of SR 109 Spur. In the unincorporated community of Alps, they intersect SR 362, which briefly joins the concurrency. Less than  later, SR 74 and 85 reach the Meriwether–Coweta county line.

Coweta County 
The concurrent highways travel through Haralson and enter the southeast part of Senoia. There, they intersect with SR 16. Less than  later, they cross over Line Creek, into Fayette County.

Fayette County 
SR 74 and 85 enter Starrs Mill, where SR 74 departs to the northwest, while SR 85 continues to the northeast. In Fayetteville, it intersects SR 92, which forms a concurrency through the city, meeting SR 54 before SR 92 departs to the northwest. Further north, after SR 314 and SR 279 terminate at SR 85, the highway crosses over Camp Creek, into Clayton County.

Clayton County 
On the southwestern edge of Riverdale, SR 85 intersects SR 138. Farther to the north is the western terminus of SR 331, which the northbound lanes of SR 85 have to take to access I-75. SR 85's northbound lanes continue for another , and then they end at a U-turn to go back to the south. However, the southbound lanes start at a partial interchange with I-75 (which does not have access from I-75 north to SR 85) and I-285, approximately  farther to the north-northeast.

National Highway System 
There are two sections of SR 85 that are part of the National Highway System, a system of routes determined to be the most important for the nation's economy, mobility, and defense:
 From its southern terminus to the Muscogee–Harris county line, south-southwest of Ellerslie
 From its intersection with SR 54 in Fayetteville to its northern terminus

Major intersections

History

1930s
In 1930, SR 85 was established from Columbus to SR 41 in Warm Springs, with the Muscogee County portion and a small portion just slightly north of the Muscogee–Harris county line having a completed hard surface. By the middle of 1933, the portion of the highway from about Ellerslie to Warm Springs had a "sand clay or top soil" surface. The next year, the segment of the highway just south-southwest of Warm Springs was shifted westward to a curve into the city. In 1935, SR 85 was extended southeast on SR 41 to Manchester and then north-northeast through Woodbury and Senoia and into Fayetteville. At the end of 1936, two segments were under construction: around Shiloh and just west-southwest of Warm Springs. A few months later, SR 85 was extended north-northeast to US 19/US 41/SR 3 in Hapeville. By the middle of the year, a portion from approximately halfway between Waverly Hall and Shiloh to Warm Springs was under construction. Near the end of the year, the entire highway from Columbus to just south-southwest of Waverly Hall had a completed hard surface. A portion north-northeast of Waverly Hall was under construction, while the rest of the Waverly Hall–Warm Springs segment had completed grading, but was not surfaced. In 1938, a portion about halfway between Woodbury and Gay was under construction. A portion south of the Meriwether–Coweta county line under construction, as well. The portion just north-northeast of Riverdale was under construction, while the rest of the Riverdale–Hapeville segment had completed grading, but was not surfaced. By mid-1939, a small portion just south of Waverly Hall had a completed hard surface. Near the end of the year, a small portion just north-northeast of Senoia had a completed hard surface. The year ended with the segment from Waverly Hall to Warm Springs having a completed hard surface.

1940s
In 1940, SR 163 was built from Warm Springs to Woodbury. From Manchester to approximately halfway between it and Woodbury, as well as the Gay–Oakland and Clayton County portions, SR 85 was under construction. From approximately halfway between Woodbury and Gay into Gay, SR 85 had completed grading, but was not surfaced. By the middle of 1941, SR 163's segment just northeast of Warm Springs was under construction. At the end of the year, a portion of SR 85 just east-northeast of Manchester, as well as a segment from the Fayette–Clayton county line to Riverdale, had a completed hard surface. At this time, a portion of the highway from south of Woodbury had completed grading, but was not surfaced. In 1942, a portion of SR 163 northeast of Warm Springs, as well as the Fayette County portion of the Fayetteville–Riverdale segment of SR 85, had completed grading, but was not surfaced. SR 85, from north-northeast of Starrs Mill to Fayetteville was under construction. The next year, a portion northeast of Manchester had a completed hard surface. In 1944, a portion south of Woodbury had a sand clay or top soil surface. Also, the Gay–Alvaton segment had completed grading, but was not surfaced. By the end of 1946, SR 85 was shifted eastward to a more direct path between Columbus and Manchester. Its old path between south of Shiloh and Warm Springs was redesignated as a southerly extension of SR 163. SR 85 Spur was built in Manchester from SR 41 to SR 85. The entire length of SR 85 from Columbus to Chalybeate Springs had a completed hard surface. A small portion north-northeast of Chalybeate Springs had a sand clay or top soil surface; the portion from there to Woodbury had a completed hard surface. Between 1946 and 1948, the Chalybeate Springs–Woodbury and Starrs Mill–Hapeville segments had a completed hard surface, while the Woodbury–Senoia segment had a "sand clay, top soil, or stabilized earth" surface. The next year, from Woodbury to just north-northwest of Gay, SR 85 had a completed hard surface.

1950s
By the middle of 1950, US 27 Alt. was designated on SR 85 between Columbus and a point south of Shiloh and on SR 163 from there to Warm Springs. The segment of SR 85 from just north-northwest of Gay to Starrs Mill had a completed hard surface. By 1952, SR 163 was redesignated as SR 85W. That year, SR 85W's segment south of Warm Springs was reverted to being designated as SR 163. The next year, this was undone. Also, the segment of SR 85W from Warm Springs to Woodbury had completed grading, but was not surfaced. By the middle of 1955, this segment was hard surfaced. Two years later, SR 85 from south of Shiloh to Woodbury was redesignated as SR 85E.

1960s to 1990s
Between 1960 and 1963, US 27 Alt. was shifted eastward onto SR 85E from south of Shiloh to Manchester. Between 1963 and 1966, the northern terminus was truncated to its current location in the extreme western part of Forest Park. About thirty years later, SR 85W was redesignated SR 85 Alt., while SR 85E was redesignated as part of the SR 85 mainline again.

Special routes

State Route 85 Alternate

State Route 85 Alternate (SR 85 Alt.) is a  alternate route of SR 85 that connects the Shiloh and Woodbury areas, via Warm Springs. From its southern terminus to Warm Springs, it is concurrent with U.S. Route 27 Alternate (US 27 Alt.).

The highway that would eventually become SR 85 Alt. was established in 1930, SR 85 was established from south of Shiloh to SR 41 in Warm Springs, with the Muscogee County portion and a small portion just slightly north of the Muscogee–Harris county line having a completed hard surface. By the middle of 1933, the portion of the highway from about Ellerslie to Warm Springs had a "sand clay or top soil" surface. The next year, the segment of the highway just south-southwest of Warm Springs was shifted westward to a curve into the city. At the end of 1936, two segments were under construction: around Shiloh and just west-southwest of Warm Springs. By the middle of the year, a portion from approximately halfway between Waverly Hall and Shiloh to Warm Springs was under construction. Near the end of the year, the entire highway from Columbus to just south-southwest of Waverly Hall had a completed hard surface. A portion north-northeast of Waverly Hall was under construction, while the rest of the Waverly Hall–Warm Springs segment had completed grading, but was not surfaced. By mid-1939, a small portion just south of Waverly Hall had a completed hard surface. The year ended with the segment from Waverly Hall to Warm Springs having a completed hard surface.

In 1940, SR 163 was built from Warm Springs to Woodbury. By the middle of 1941, SR 163's segment just northeast of Warm Springs was under construction. In 1942, a portion of SR 163 northeast of Warm Springs had completed grading, but was not surfaced. By the end of 1946, SR 85 was shifted eastward to a more direct path between Columbus and Manchester. Its old path between south of Shiloh and Warm Springs was redesignated as a southerly extension of SR 163. By the middle of 1950, US 27 Alt. was designated on SR 163 from south of Shiloh to Warm Springs. By 1952, SR 163 was redesignated as SR 85W. That year, SR 85W's segment south of Warm Springs was reverted to being designated as SR 163. The next year, this was undone. Also, the segment of SR 85W from Warm Springs to Woodbury had completed grading, but was not surfaced. By the middle of 1955, this segment was hard surfaced. Between 1960 and 1963, US 27 Alt. was shifted eastward off of SR 85W and onto SR 85E. About thirty-three years later, SR 85W was redesignated as SR 85 Alt.

State Route 85 Spur

State Route 85 Spur (SR 85 Spur) is a spur route of SR 85 that exists completely within the city limits of Manchester. It connects SR 41 (North 5th Avenue) with the SR 85 mainline. It is used to bypass downtown Manchester.

By the end of 1946, SR 85 Spur was built in Manchester from SR 41 to SR 85.

See also

References

External links
 

 Georgia Roads (Routes 81 - 100)
 Georgia State Route 85 on State-Ends.com

085
Transportation in Muscogee County, Georgia
Transportation in Harris County, Georgia
Transportation in Talbot County, Georgia
Transportation in Meriwether County, Georgia
Transportation in Coweta County, Georgia
Transportation in Fayette County, Georgia
Transportation in Clayton County, Georgia
Transportation in Columbus, Georgia
Columbus metropolitan area, Georgia